Travis Cole is a former arena football quarterback. He is a 1997 graduate of Lakeridge High School in Lake Oswego, Oregon and played football and baseball for the Pacers. Cole was selected in the 52nd round of the 1997 Major League Baseball Draft by the Toronto Blue Jays, but chose to attend Foothill College instead. After completing his juco career, Cole transferred to the University of Minnesota, where he played quarterback on the football team and pitcher on the baseball team. He has since spent time on the rosters of the Pittsburgh Steelers, Arizona Rattlers, and Utah Blaze. He has since retired from football and is a technology consultant for Microsoft Corporation in Redmond, Washington.

External links
Arizona Rattlers Bio

Minnesota Golden Gophers baseball players
Minnesota Golden Gophers football players
Sportspeople from Lake Oswego, Oregon
Living people
Players of American football from Oregon
Arizona Rattlers players
Lakeridge High School alumni
Rio Grande Valley Dorados players
Utah Blaze players
1979 births